Clubul Sportiv Conpet Ploiești, also known as Conpet Ploiești, was a Romanian football club from Strejnicu, Prahova County. Founded in 1968 and disbanded in 2015, Conpet played fifteen consecutive seasons in the third football division in Romania between 1999 and 2014. The club played at the Conpet Stadium in Strejnicu, located 3 km from Ploiești and was supported financially by Conpet, the national operator for transporting crude oil and derivatives through pipelines from Romania.

History
Founded in 1968, Conpet played most of its history in the lower leagues, managing to promoted in Liga III at the end of the 1998–99 season after won Liga IV – Prahova County.

With Marius Vișan as head coach, Conpet finished the 2006–07 campaign on seventh place.

The 2007–08 season started with Marius Vișan as head coach, but was sacked in the first part of the season, and Decu Crângașu led the team as interim. Silviu Dumitrescu was appointed as head coach in January 2008, leading the club to the fifth place at the end of the season.

The next two seasons saw "the carriers" on top of the league finishing on third place in the 2008–09 and on the second place in the 2009–10 season.

Silviu Dumitrescu left the club in May 2011 with three rounds before the end of the season and Conpet finished the 2010–11 season on the eight place, with Gheorghe Bărbuceanu as caretaker manager.

Mugur Bolohan was named as the new head coach and "the carriers" finished the 2011–12 season on the fourth place.

Conpet finished the  2012–13 season in sixth place out of ten.

At the end of the 2013–14 Liga III campaign Conpet finished 2nd in the play-out, 8th in the overall standings, thus remaining in the Third Division, but at the beginning of the next season, due to financial reasons, Conpet withdrew from Liga III and enrolled in the Liga IV – Prahova County.

Honours
Liga III
Runners-up (1): 2009–10
Liga IV – Prahova County
Winners (1): 1998–99

Other performances 
Appearances in Liga III: 15

League history

References

Sport in Ploiești
Association football clubs established in 1968
Association football clubs disestablished in 2015
Defunct football clubs in Romania
Football clubs in Prahova County
Liga III clubs
Liga IV clubs
1968 establishments in Romania
2015 disestablishments in Romania